The lieutenant governor of Kentucky was created under the state's second constitution, which was ratified in 1799. The inaugural officeholder was Alexander Scott Bullitt, who took office in 1800 following his election to serve under James Garrard in 1799. The lieutenant governor becomes governor of Kentucky under circumstances similar to those under which the vice president of the United States assumes the presidency. The current lieutenant governor is Democrat Jacqueline Coleman, who has been office since December 10, 2019.

Duties of the Kentucky lieutenant governor
As specified in Kentucky Revised Statute 11.400, it states:

11.400 Duties of Lieutenant Governor.
(1) In addition to the duties prescribed for the office by the Constitution of the
Commonwealth of Kentucky, the duties of the Lieutenant Governor shall be as
follows:
(a) To serve as vice chairman of the State Property and Buildings Commission as
prescribed by KRS 56.450;
(b) To serve as vice chairman of the Kentucky Turnpike Authority as prescribed
in KRS 175.430;
(c) To serve as a member of the Kentucky Council on Agriculture in accordance
with KRS 247.417;
(d) To appoint one (1) member of the Public Officials' Compensation
Commission as provided in KRS 64.742;
(e) To serve as a member of the Board of the Kentucky Housing Corporation in
accordance with KRS 198A.030; and
(f) To serve as a member of Kentucky delegations on the following interstate
compact commissions or boards:
1. The Southern Growth Policies Board as prescribed by KRS 147.585;
2. The Breaks Interstate Park Commission as provided in KRS 148.225;
3. The Falls of the Ohio Interstate Park Commission pursuant to KRS
148.242;
4. The Tennessee-Tombigbee Waterway Development Authority pursuant
to KRS 182.305;
5. The Interstate Water Sanitation Control Commissions as prescribed by
KRS 224.18-710; and
6. The Kentucky Mining Advisory Council for the Interstate Mining
Compact as provided by KRS 350.310.
(2) Nothing in this section shall prohibit the Governor and Lieutenant Governor from
agreeing upon additional duties within the executive branch of the state government
to be performed by the Lieutenant Governor.
Effective: June 26, 2007

Changes by 1992 amendment
The role and powers of the lieutenant governor of Kentucky were altered by a 1992 amendment to the Constitution of Kentucky. Prior to that 1992 amendment to the Constitution of Kentucky the lieutenant governor became acting governor at any time that the governor was outside of the commonwealth. Lieutenant governors Thelma Stovall (1975–1979) and Happy Chandler (1931–1935) engaged in high-profile use of their powers as acting governor when the elected governor was out of the commonwealth.

Also prior to the 1992 amendment of the Constitution of Kentucky, the lieutenant governor of Kentucky presided over the Kentucky Senate, casting a vote only in the event of a tie. The 1992 constitutional amendment supplanted the office of President pro tempore of the Kentucky Senate with the new office of President of the Kentucky Senate as presiding officer and abolished the lieutenant governor's duties involving the Senate. As a result, the lieutenant governor has no ongoing constitutional duties, and his or her traditional use of the Old Governor's Mansion as an official residence has been phased out.

Candidates for governor and lieutenant governor in Kentucky run together on party slates. This is the result of the same 1992 constitutional amendment; prior to that the candidates for both offices ran separately and, as a result, sometimes the two elected to those offices were not allies and did not work together. This was famously highlighted when then-Lt. Gov. A. B. "Happy" Chandler in 1935 and then-Lt. Gov. Thelma Stovall in 1978 called the Kentucky General Assembly into session to enact legislation that was not advocated by the governors at the time (Ruby Laffoon and Julian Carroll, respectively). In 1967 a Republican, Louie Nunn, was elected governor and a Democrat, Wendell H. Ford, was elected lieutenant governor; they served together in that way for four years.

List of lieutenant governors

Some accounts also indicate that Kentucky's Confederate government had one lieutenant governor, Horatio F. Simrall, who was elected at the Russellville Convention in 1861. Simrall fled to Mississippi shortly thereafter.

See also
Governor of Kentucky

References

 
Commonwealth constitutional officers of Kentucky
Kentucky